The 2011 California Vulcans football team represented California University of Pennsylvania as a member of the West Division of the Pennsylvania State Athletic Conference (PSAC) during the 2011 NCAA Division II football season. The team's offense scored 405 points while the defense allowed 209 points. The Vulcans played home games at Adamson Stadium in California, Pennsylvania.

Schedule

References

California
California Vulcans football seasons
California Vulcans football